Hen Reuven is an Israeli footballer currently playing for Ahva Reineh.

References

1992 births
Living people
Israeli Jews
Israeli footballers
Maccabi Netanya F.C. players
Sektzia Ness Ziona F.C. players
Hapoel Herzliya F.C. players
Hapoel Bnei Lod F.C. players
Nordia Jerusalem F.C. players
Hapoel Ashdod F.C. players
Hapoel Ironi Baqa al-Gharbiyye F.C. players
Maccabi Herzliya F.C. players
Footballers from Hadera
Association football defenders